The Alemanni or Alamanni were a confederation of Germanic tribes on the Upper Rhine River during the first millennium.

In 496, the Alemanni were conquered by the Frankish leader Clovis and incorporated into his dominions. Mentioned as still pagan allies of the Christian Franks, the Alemanni were gradually Christianized during the seventh century. The  is a record of their customary law during this period. Until the eighth century, Frankish suzerainty over Alemannia was mostly nominal. After an uprising by Theudebald, Duke of Alamannia, however, Carloman executed the Alamannic nobility and installed Frankish dukes.

During the later and weaker years of the Carolingian Empire, the Alemannic counts became almost independent, and a struggle for supremacy took place between them and the Bishopric of Constance.

The area settled by the Alemanni corresponds roughly to the area where Alemannic German dialects remain spoken, including German Swabia and Baden, French Alsace, German-speaking Switzerland, Liechtenstein and Austrian Vorarlberg. The French-language name of Germany, is derived from their name, from Old French aleman(t), and from French was loaned into a number of other languages, including Middle English, which commonly used the term Almains for Germans.

Name

According to Gaius Asinius Quadratus (quoted in the mid-sixth century by Byzantine historian Agathias), the name Alamanni  (Ἀλαμανοι) means "all men". It indicates that they were a conglomeration drawn from various Germanic tribes. The Romans and the Greeks called them as such (Alamanni, all men, in the sense of a group composed of men of all groups in the region). This derivation was accepted by Edward Gibbon, in his Decline and Fall of the Roman Empire and by the anonymous contributor of notes assembled from the papers of Nicolas Fréret, published in 1753.
This etymology has remained the standard derivation of the name.
An alternative suggestion proposes derivation from *alah "sanctuary".

Walafrid Strabo in the ninth century remarked, in discussing the people of Switzerland and the surrounding regions, that only foreigners called them the Alemanni, but that they gave themselves the name of Suebi.
The Suebi are given the alternative name of Ziuwari (as Cyuuari) in an Old High German gloss, interpreted by Jacob Grimm as Martem colentes ("worshippers of Mars"). Annio da Viterbo a scholar and historian of the 15th century claimed the Alemanni had their name from the hebrew language, as in hebrew the river Rhine was translated into Mannum and the people who live at its shores were called Alemannus. This was refuted by Beatus Rhenanus, a humanist of the 16th century. Rhenanus argued the term Alemanni was meant for the whole Germanic people only in late antiquity and before it was only meant to designate the population of an island in the North Sea.

First appearance in historical record

Early Roman writers did not mention the Alemanni, and it is likely that they had not yet come to exist. In his Germania Tacitus (AD 90) does not mention the Alemanni. He uses the term Agri Decumates to describe the region between the Rhine, Main and Danube rivers. He says that it had once been the home of the Helvetians, who had moved westwards into Gaul in the time of Julius Caesar. The people living there in Caesar's time are not Germanic. Instead, :Reckless adventurers from Gaul, emboldened by want, occupied this land of questionable ownership. After a while, our frontier having been advanced, and our military positions pushed forward, it was regarded as a remote nook of our empire and a part of a Roman province.

The Alemanni were first mentioned by Cassius Dio describing the campaign of Caracalla in 213. At that time, they apparently dwelt in the basin of the Main, to the south of the Chatti.

Cassius Dio portrays the Alemanni as victims of this treacherous emperor. They had asked for his help, according to Dio, but instead he colonized their country, changed their place names, and executed their warriors under a pretext of coming to their aid. When he became ill, the Alemanni claimed to have put a hex on him. Caracalla, it was claimed, tried to counter this influence by invoking his ancestral spirits.

In retribution, Caracalla then led the Legio II Traiana Fortis against the Alemanni, who lost and were pacified for a time. The legion was as a result honored with the name Germanica. The fourth-century fictional Historia Augusta, Life of Antoninus Caracalla, relates (10.5) that Caracalla then assumed the name Alemannicus, at which Helvius Pertinax jested that he should really be called Geticus Maximus, because in the year before he had murdered his brother, Geta.

Through much of his short reign, Caracalla was known for unpredictable and arbitrary operations launched by surprise after a pretext of peace negotiations. If he had any reasons of state for such actions, they remained unknown to his contemporaries. Whether or not the Alemanni had been previously neutral, they were certainly further influenced by Caracalla to become thereafter notoriously implacable enemies of Rome.

This mutually antagonistic relationship is perhaps the reason why the Roman writers persisted in calling the Alemanni ”barbari," meaning "savages." The archaeology, however, shows that they were largely Romanized, lived in Roman-style houses and used Roman artifacts, the Alemannic women having adopted the Roman fashion of the tunica even earlier than the men.

Most of the Alemanni were probably at the time, in fact, resident in or close to the borders of Germania Superior. Although Dio is the earliest writer to mention them, Ammianus Marcellinus used the name to refer to Germans on the Limes Germanicus in the time of Trajan's governorship of the province shortly after it was formed, around 98-99 AD. At that time, the entire frontier was being fortified for the first time. Trees from the earliest fortifications found in Germania Inferior are dated by dendrochronology to 99-100 AD.

Ammianus relates (xvii.1.11) that much later the Emperor Julian undertook a punitive expedition against the Alemanni, who by then were in Alsace, and crossed the Main (Latin Menus), entering the forest, where the trails were blocked by felled trees. As winter was upon them, they reoccupied a
"fortification which was founded on the soil of the Alemanni that Trajan wished to be called with his own name".

In this context, the use of Alemanni is possibly an anachronism, but it reveals that Ammianus believed they were the same people, which is consistent with the location of the Alemanni of Caracalla's campaigns.

Conflicts with the Roman Empire

The Alemanni were continually engaged in conflicts with the Roman Empire in the third and fourth centuries. They launched a major invasion of Gaul and northern Italy in 268, when the Romans were forced to denude much of their German frontier of troops in response to a massive invasion of the Goths from the east. Their raids throughout the three parts of Gaul were traumatic: Gregory of Tours (died ca 594) mentions their destructive force at the time of Valerian and Gallienus (253–260), when the Alemanni assembled under their "king", whom he calls Chrocus, who acted "by the advice, it is said, of his wicked mother, and overran the whole of the Gauls, and destroyed from their foundations all the temples which had been built in ancient times. And coming to Clermont he set on fire, overthrew and destroyed that shrine which they call Vasso Galatae in the Gallic tongue," martyring many Christians (Historia Francorum Book I.32–34). Thus sixth-century Gallo-Romans of Gregory's class, surrounded by the ruins of Roman temples and public buildings, attributed the destruction they saw to the plundering raids of the Alemanni.

In the early summer of 268, the Emperor Gallienus halted their advance into Italy, but then had to deal with the Goths. When the Gothic campaign ended in Roman victory at the Battle of Naissus in September, Gallienus' successor Claudius Gothicus turned north to deal with the Alemanni, who were swarming over all Italy north of the Po River.

After efforts to secure a peaceful withdrawal failed, Claudius forced the Alemanni to battle at the Battle of Lake Benacus in November. The Alemanni were routed, forced back into Germany, and did not threaten Roman territory for many years afterwards.

Their most famous battle against Rome took place in Argentoratum (Strasbourg), in 357, where they were defeated by Julian, later Emperor of Rome, and their king Chnodomarius was taken prisoner to Rome.

On January 2, 366, the Alemanni yet again crossed the frozen Rhine in large numbers, to invade the Gallic provinces, this time being defeated by Valentinian (see Battle of Solicinium). In the great mixed invasion of 406, the Alemanni appear to have crossed the Rhine river a final time, conquering and then settling what is today Alsace and a large part of the Swiss Plateau. The crossing is described in Wallace Breem's historical novel Eagle in the Snow. The Chronicle of Fredegar gives the account. At Alba Augusta (Alba-la-Romaine) the devastation was so complete, that the Christian bishop retired to Viviers, but in Gregory's account at Mende in Lozère, also deep in the heart of Gaul, bishop Privatus was forced to sacrifice to idols in the very cave where he was later venerated.  It is thought this detail may be a generic literary ploy to epitomize the horrors of barbarian violence.

List of battles between Romans and Alemanni 

 259, Battle of MediolanumEmperor Gallienus defeats the Alemanni to rescue Rome
 268, Battle of Lake BenacusRomans under Emperor Claudius II defeat the Alemanni.
 271
 Battle of PlacentiaEmperor Aurelian is defeated by the Alemanni forces invading Italy
 Battle of FanoAurelian defeats the Alemanni, who begin to retreat from Italy
 Battle of PaviaAurelian destroys the retreating Alemanni army.
 298
 Battle of LingonesCaesar Constantius Chlorus defeats the Alemanni
 Battle of VindonissaConstantius defeats the Alemanni.
 356, Battle of ReimsCaesar Julian is defeated by the Alemanni
 357, Battle of StrasbourgJulian expels the Alemanni from the Rhineland
 368, Battle of SoliciniumRomans under Emperor Valentinian I defeat an Alemanni incursion.
 378, Battle of ArgentovariaWestern Emperor Gratianus is victorious over the Alemanni. 
 451, Battle of the Catalaunian FieldsRoman General Aetius and his army of Romans and barbarian allies defeat Attila's army of Huns and other Germanic allies, including the Alemanni.
 457, Battle of Campi CanniniAlemanni invade Italy and are defeated near Lake Maggiore by Majorian
 554, Battle of the VolturnusByzantine General Narses defeats a combined force of Franks and Alemanni in southern Italy.

Subjugation by the Franks

The kingdom of Alamannia between Strasbourg and Augsburg lasted until 496, when the Alemanni were conquered by Clovis I at the Battle of Tolbiac. The war of Clovis with the Alemanni forms the setting for the conversion of Clovis, briefly treated by Gregory of Tours. (Book II.31) After their defeat in 496, the Alemanni bucked the Frankish yoke and put themselves under the protection of Theodoric the Great of the Ostrogoths but after his death they were again subjugated by the Franks under Theudebert I in 536. Subsequently, the Alemanni formed part of the Frankish dominions and were governed by a Frankish duke.

In 746, Carloman ended an uprising by summarily executing all Alemannic nobility at the blood court at Cannstatt, and for the following century, Alemannia was ruled by Frankish dukes. Following the treaty of Verdun of 843, Alemannia became a province of the eastern kingdom of Louis the German, the precursor of the Holy Roman Empire. The duchy persisted until 1268.

Culture

Language

The German spoken today over the range of the former Alemanni is termed Alemannic German, and is recognised among the subgroups of the High German languages. Alemannic runic inscriptions such as those on the Pforzen buckle are among the earliest testimonies of Old High German.
The High German consonant shift is thought to have originated around the fifth century either in Alemannia or among the Lombards; before that the dialect spoken by Alemannic tribes was little different from that of other West Germanic peoples.

Alemannia lost its distinct jurisdictional identity when Charles Martel absorbed it into the Frankish empire, early in the eighth century. Today, Alemannic is a linguistic term, referring to Alemannic German, encompassing the dialects of the southern two thirds of Baden-Württemberg (German State), in western Bavaria (German State), in Vorarlberg (Austrian State), Swiss German in Switzerland and the Alsatian language of the Alsace (France).

Political organization
The Alemanni established a series of territorially defined pagi (cantons) on the east bank of the Rhine. The exact number and extent of these pagi is unclear and probably changed over time.

Pagi, usually pairs of pagi combined, formed kingdoms (regna) which, it is generally believed, were permanent and hereditary. Ammianus describes Alemanni rulers with various terms: reges excelsiores ante alios ("paramount kings"), reges proximi ("neighbouring kings"), reguli ("petty kings") and regales ("princes"). This may be a formal hierarchy, or they may be vague, overlapping terms, or a combination of both. In 357, there appear to have been two paramount kings (Chnodomar and Westralp) who probably acted as presidents of the confederation and seven other kings (reges). Their territories were small and mostly strung along the Rhine (although a few were in the hinterland). It is possible that the reguli were the rulers of the two pagi in each kingdom. Underneath the royal class were the nobles (called optimates by the Romans) and warriors (called armati by the Romans). The warriors consisted of professional warbands and levies of free men. Each nobleman could raise an average of c. 50 warriors.

Religion

The Christianization of the Alemanni took place during Merovingian times (sixth to eighth centuries). We know that in the sixth century, the Alemanni were predominantly pagan, and in the eighth century, they were predominantly Christian. The intervening seventh century was a period of genuine syncretism during which Christian symbolism and doctrine gradually grew in influence.

Some scholars have speculated that members of the Alemannic elite such as king Gibuld due to Visigothic influence may have been converted to Arianism even in the later fifth century.

In the mid-6th century, the Byzantine historian Agathias records, in the context of the wars of the Goths and Franks against Byzantium, that the Alemanni fighting among the troops of Frankish king Theudebald were like the Franks in all respects except religion, since

He also spoke of the particular ruthlessness of the Alemanni in destroying Christian sanctuaries and plundering churches while the genuine Franks were respectful towards those sanctuaries. Agathias expresses his hope that the Alemanni would assume better manners through prolonged contact with the Franks, which is by all appearances, in a manner of speaking, what eventually happened.

Apostles of the Alemanni were Columbanus and his disciple Saint Gall. Jonas of Bobbio records that Columbanus was active in Bregenz, where he disrupted a beer sacrifice to Wodan. Despite these activities, for some time, the Alemanni seem to have continued their pagan cult activities, with only superficial or syncretistic Christian elements. In particular, there is no change in burial practice, and tumulus warrior graves continued to be erected throughout Merovingian times. Syncretism of traditional Germanic animal-style with Christian symbolism is also present in artwork, but Christian symbolism becomes more and more prevalent during the seventh century. Unlike the later Christianization of the Saxons and of the Slavs, the Alemanni seem to have adopted Christianity gradually, and voluntarily, spread in emulation of the Merovingian elite.

From c. the 520s to the 620s, there was a surge of Alemannic Elder Futhark inscriptions. About 70 specimens have survived, roughly half of them on fibulae, others on belt buckles (see Pforzen buckle, Bülach fibula) and other jewelry and weapon parts. Use of runes subsides with the advance of Christianity.
The Nordendorf fibula (early seventh century) clearly records pagan theonyms, logaþorewodanwigiþonar  read as  "Wodan and Donar are magicians/sorcerers", but this may be interpreted as either a pagan invocation of the powers of these deities, or a Christian protective charm against them.
A runic inscription on a fibula found at Bad Ems reflects Christian pious sentiment (and is also explicitly marked with a Christian cross), reading god fura dih deofile ᛭ ("God for/before you, Theophilus!", or alternatively "God before you, Devil!"). Dated to between AD 660 and 690, it marks the end of the native Alemannic tradition of runic literacy. Bad Ems is in Rhineland-Palatinate, on the northwestern boundary of Alemannic settlement, where Frankish influence would have been strongest.

The establishment of the bishopric of Konstanz cannot be dated exactly and was possibly undertaken by Columbanus himself (before 612). In any case, it existed by 635, when Gunzo appointed John of Grab bishop. Constance was a missionary bishopric in newly converted lands, and did not look back on late Roman church history unlike the Raetian bishopric of Chur (established 451) and Basel (an episcopal seat from 740, and which continued the line of Bishops of Augusta Raurica, see Bishop of Basel). The establishment of the church as an institution recognized by worldly rulers is also visible in legal history. In the early seventh century Pactus Alamannorum hardly ever mentions the special privileges of the church, while Lantfrid's Lex Alamannorum of 720 has an entire chapter reserved for ecclesial matters alone.

Genetics

A genetic study published in Science Advances in September 2018 examined the remains of eight individuals buried at a seventh-century Alemannic graveyard in Niederstotzingen, Germany. This is the richest and most complete Alemannic graveyard ever found. The highest ranking individual at the graveyard was a male with Frankish grave goods. Four males were found to be closely related to him. They were all carriers of types of the paternal haplogroup R1b1a2a1a1c2b2b. A sixth male was a carrier of the paternal haplogroup R1b1a2a1a1c2b2b1a1 and the maternal haplogroup U5a1a1. Along with the five closely related individuals, he displayed close genetic links to northern and eastern Europe, particularly Lithuania and Iceland. Two individuals buried at the cemetery were found to be genetically different from both the others and each other, displaying genetic links to Southern Europe, particularly northern Italy and Spain. Along with the sixth male, they might have been adoptees or slaves.

See also
Annales Alamannici
List of rulers of Alamannia
List of confederations of Germanic tribes
Armalausi
Varisci
Helvetii
Charietto

References

Sources

 Ammianus Marcellinus, passim
 O. Bremer in H. Paul, Grundriss der germanischen Philologie (2nd ed., Strassburg, 1900), vol. iii. pp. 930 ff.
 Dio Cassius lxvii. ff.
  
 Ian Wood (ed.), Franks and Alamanni in the Merovingian Period: An Ethnographic Perspective (Studies in Historical Archaeoethnology), Boydell & Brewer Ltd, 2003,  .
 Melchior Goldast, Rerum Alamannicarum scriptores (1606, 2nd ed. Senckenburg 1730)
 Gregory of Tours, Historia Francorum, book ii.
 
 C. Zeuss, Die Deutschen und die Nachbarstämme (Munich, 1837), pp. 303 ff.

External links

The Agri Decumates
The Alemanni
The Military Orientation of the Roman Emperors Septimius Severus to Gallienus (146–268 C.E.)
Brauchtum und Masken Alemannic Fastnacht 

 
Early Germanic peoples
German tribes